Lifi may refer to:

 Lifi (manhwa), Korean manhwa comic by Sanho Kim
 Li-Fi (light fidelity), wireless data networking using light
 Li-Fi Consortium, industry consortium for the promotion and development of the LiFi standard

See also
 High fidelity (disambiguation)
 
 Hi-fi
 
 Wi-Fi
 Fi (disambiguation)
 Li (disambiguation)